Worcester may refer to:

Places

United Kingdom
 Worcester, England, a city and the county town of Worcestershire in England
 Worcester (UK Parliament constituency), an area represented by a Member of Parliament
 Worcester Park, London, England
 Worcestershire, a county in England

United States
 Worcester, Massachusetts, the largest city with the name in the United States
 Worcester County, Massachusetts
 Worcester, Missouri
 Worcester, New York, a town
 Worcester (CDP), New York, within the town
 Worcester Township, Montgomery County, Pennsylvania
 Worcester, Vermont
 Worcester (CDP), Vermont, within the town
 Worcester, Wisconsin, a town
 Worcester (community), Wisconsin, an unincorporated community
 Worcester County, Maryland
 Barry, Illinois, formerly known as Worcester
 Marquette, Michigan, formerly known as New Worcester

Other places
 Worcester, Limpopo, South Africa
 Worcester, Western Cape, South Africa
 Worcester Summit, Antarctica

Transportation
 Worcester, a GWR 3031 Class locomotive that was built for and run on the Great Western Railway between 1891 and 1915
 Union Station (Worcester, Massachusetts), called "Worcester" by the Massachusetts Bay Transportation Authority
 HMS Worcester, several ships of the British Royal Navy
 USS Worcester, several ships of the United States Navy
 Worcester, a 1785 launched British East Indiaman

People
 John of Worcester, English monk and chronicler
 Roger of Worcester, Bishop of Worcester
 Sylvester of Worcester, Bishop of Worcester
 Worcester (surname)

Foods
 Worcester Pearmain, an English apple cultivar
 Worcestershire sauce, often "Worcester sauce", a spicy condiment devised in Worcester, England, in the 19th c.

Other uses
 Worcester Academy
 Worcester, Bosch Group, a British domestic heating company
 Worcester College (disambiguation)
 Royal Worcester, an English bone china and porcelain manufacturer

See also
 Worcester v. Georgia, an 1832 U.S. Supreme Court Case
 Wooster (disambiguation)